Quercus depressa is a species of red oak endemic to Mexico.

References

depressa
Endemic oaks of Mexico
Least concern flora of North America
Taxa named by Aimé Bonpland
Taxa named by Alexander von Humboldt
Taxonomy articles created by Polbot
Flora of the Sierra Madre Oriental
Flora of the Sierra Madre de Oaxaca